Alvin William Nienow  is a British chemical engineer. He is emeritus professor of biochemical engineering at the  University of Birmingham, where he was also director of the School of Chemical Engineering between 1989 and 1999. He is a fellow of both the Institution of Chemical Engineers and the Royal Academy of Engineering, and an honorary professor of Loughborough University. He is a visiting professor there and at Aston University. According to Scopus he has an h-index of 64.

Books 
 as editor, with Norman Harnby and Michael Frederick Edwards (1985). Mixing in the process industries. London: Butterworths. .

References

British chemical engineers